Vuna may refer to:

 Cooper Vuna (born 1987), rugby player
 Joseph Vuna (born 1998), rugby player
 Vuna Takitakimālohi (1844–1862), Prince of Tonga